Huizinga is a Dutch surname. Notable people with the surname include:

Chuck Huizinga (born 1953), Dutch-Canadian hockey player
Ilse Huizinga (born 1966), Dutch singer
Johan Huizinga, Dutch historian
John Huizinga, Dutch physical anthropologist
Mark Huizinga, Dutch judoka and Olympic gold medalist 
Tineke Huizinga, Dutch politician

See also
 Huizenga (name)

Dutch-language surnames